Perry Diamond Pearl (born  1824) was a Michigan politician.

Early life
Pearl was born around 1824 in New York.

Career
Pearl was a farmer. On November 5, 1872, Pearl was elected to the Michigan House of Representatives where he represented the Wayne County 5th district from January 4, 1871 to December 31, 1872. During his time in the legislature, Pearl lived in Belleville, Michigan.

Personal life
Pearl was married.

References

1820s births
Year of death missing
Members of the Michigan House of Representatives
People from Belleville, Michigan
People from New York (state)
19th-century American politicians